Ubon Ratchathani Airport  is an airport in the capital district of Ubon Ratchathani, in Ubon Ratchathani Province, Northeastern Thailand. It currently serves as both a commercial airport and as a Royal Thai Air Force base.

History
The airport was first opened in 1921, when the nearby Warin Chamrap district was affected by smallpox and cholera epidemic. The authorities have sent doctors and medical supplies by plane to Ubon Ratchathani province to alleviate the suffering of the residents.

In 1955 it became Ubon Royal Thai Air Force Base for the Vietnam War; in 1975 the facility became an international civilian airport, with direct flights to Vietnam. These flights proved unprofitable, and while the international signage is still in place, only domestic flights have operated for a number of years.

Airlines and destinations

Statistics

Passenger movements

Busiest domestic routes

Military use

Established in the 1950s as a Royal Thai Air Force base, it was used by the United States Air Force and the Royal Australian Air Force during the Vietnam War.

The airport is currently an active Royal Thai Air Force base, the home of 2nd Air Division/21st Wing Air Combat Command. The 211sq Eagles fly Northrup F-5E/F Tiger II fighter aircraft.

References

External links
 
 Ubon Ratchathani Airport, Dept of Civil Aviation
 UBP Real Time Flight Information

Airports in Thailand
Buildings and structures in Ubon Ratchathani province
Airports established in 1921